Calverton was a station stop along the Greenport Branch of the Long Island Rail Road in Calverton, New York. The station was built in 1880 and closed in 1981.

History
Calverton station was originally built around 1880 as Baiting Hollow. It was also intended to be the terminus of one of two formerly proposed extensions of the Wading River Branch. The depot closed and moved to undisclosed location around 1922 and second depot built further east around same year, which was located on Railroad Avenue between North River Road and Edwards Avenue. Calverton was the site of the deadly Golden's Pickle Works wreck on Friday, August 13, 1926. The station closed in 1981. The disused metal station shelter currently remains.

West of the station, a spur to the Naval Weapons Industrial Reserve Plant used by Grumman closed in the early 1990s. In February 2010 plans were announced to reactivate the spur in a $3.5 million rehabilitation for freight trains of the New York & Atlantic Railway to serve an industrial park at the airport. Funds come from the federal stimulus funding. The spur parallels Connecticut Avenue to the airport.

Hulse Turnout
At the same spot as Calverton there was a previous station named Hulse Turnout. Hulse Turnout first appears on the 1852 timetable and is gone by 1858.

References

External links

Calverton Station overall history (TrainsAreFun.com)

Former Long Island Rail Road stations in Suffolk County, New York
Railway stations in the United States opened in 1880
1880 establishments in New York (state)
Railway stations closed in 1981
1981 disestablishments in New York (state)